Mount Street Lower is a street in Dublin, Ireland.

Location
The street runs from Merrion Square to Northumberland Road. Mount Street Upper runs parallel to the street to the south.

History
Approval was obtained from the Wide Streets Commission in 1791 to develop the street. It was developed by Crosthwaite and Grant, having purchased the land from Samuel Sproule. The buildings were well received, but construction paused in the mid-1790s and resumed in the 1800s. There were 29 houses on the street by 1834.

During the events of the Easter Rising, one of the more successful battles for the Irish volunteers took place at Mount Street Bridge, now known as McKenny's Bridge.

By the mid-20th century, the houses were largely tenements, which housed a large inner-city community. The whole street was zoned for offices and none of the houses were listed for preservation. Over 60 Georgian houses were eventually demolished. The first office block was Prizebond House, which Frank McDonald described as "one of the worst modern buildings in Dublin" which replaced a terrace of 9 houses, one of which had belonged to Neil Goold-Verschoyle. Prizebond House was designed by M. W. Design in Cheshire, and was completed in 1970. Bridge House (later Lombard and Ulster House) and Ferry House were both designed by Burke-Kennedy Doyle for Dodder Properties. The same company developed Clanwilliam Court, on the site of Clanwilliam House which had been destroyed during the battle in 1916. The complex was built between 1974 and 1978, with 6 office blocks designed by Austin Murray.

Only a small number of the original Georgian houses have survived: numbers 3–6, 15–18, 31 and 64. Number 64 was built for the Putland family around 1790, and is a large 5-bay house with 4 storeys over a basement. It was purchased by the Bon Secours Sisters in 1866, who added an Ionic tripartite entrance, and a large room at the rear which was the chapel.

Of the modern office blocks, the 1991 buildings at 65-66 by Andrej and Danuta Wejchert are deemed the most successful. At 67-72 is the office block designed by Stephenson Gibney & Associates for the Irish Diary Board in 1972. The long brick facade of Grattan Court is deemed to have been particularly damaging to the streetscape.

References

Sources

External links

Streets in Dublin (city)